Jalan Tuanku Abdul Rahman (formerly Batu Road) is a major one-way road in Kuala Lumpur, Malaysia. The road is named after the first Yang di-Pertuan Agong, Tuanku Abdul Rahman of Negeri Sembilan.

Attractions
On the shoulders of this road are pre-war buildings with unique features that have been preserved. Retail shops like GS Gill, P. Lal and PH Henry have locations here. Modern shopping complexes are the Sogo and Maju Junction. 

Every Saturday between 5 pm to 10 pm, Lorong Tuanku Abdul Rahman is closed to vehicles to make room for the night market that offers a variety of fabrics, textiles, clothing, domestic items and food at attractive prices.

List of junctions along the road

References

 From Batu Road to Jalan TAR, The Star, 14 April 2007.

External links

 Tourism Malaysia – Jalan Tuanku Abdul Rahman

Roads in Kuala Lumpur